This is a list of Mexican television related events from 2012.

Events
27 July-12 August - The 2012 Summer Olympics in London, England, United Kingdom, is broadcast over Televisa Regional and TV Azteca. 
16 December - Luz Maria Ramírez wins the second season of La Voz... México.

Debuts

Television shows

1970s
Plaza Sésamo (1972–present)

2010s
La Voz... México (2011–present)

Ending this year

Births

Deaths

See also
List of Mexican films of 2012
2012 in Mexico

References